Problems of Post-Communism is a bimonthly peer-reviewed academic journal covering economic, political, security, and international developments in post-communist countries. Until 1992 it was known as Problems of Communism and predicted the collapse of the USSR. It was originally published by the United States Information Agency and is now published by Routledge. The editor-in-chief is Dmitry P. Gorenburg (Harvard University).

Abstracting and indexing 
The journal is abstracted and indexed in Current Contents/Social and Behavioral Sciences, ProQuest, Scopus, Social Sciences Citation Index, Sociological Abstracts, and Worldwide Political Science Abstracts. According to the Journal Citation Reports, the journal has a 2020 impact factor of 2.127, ranking it --- out of 165 journals in the category "Political Science".

References

External links
 
 Journal page at publisher's website
 Archive at Hathi Trust Digital Library

Area studies journals
Political science journals
Publications established in 1954
English-language journals
Bimonthly journals
M. E. Sharpe academic journals

See also
 Central Asian Survey
 Europe-Asia Studies